Kud is a town and a notified area committee in Udhampur district in the Indian union territory of Jammu and Kashmir. It is about 10 km from the popular tourist place Patnitop and is famous for a local sweet known as "Desi Ghee Patisa" another name of the sweet made up of milk products. Desi Ghee is a milk product and patisa is known as Papdi.

Geography
It has an average elevation of 1855 metres (6085 feet).It is a part of the Lower Himalayan Range. the river Chenab flows in close proximity. It is located on the NH 44, 100 km from Jammu and 38 km from Udhampur city. It is just short of the tourist spot of Patnitop while driving to Patnitop from Udhampur. After Patnitop is the adjoining town of Batote.

Demographics

 India census, Kud had a population of 1140. Males constitute 54% of the population and females 46%. Kud has an average literacy rate of 59%, lower than the national average of 59.5%: male literacy is 69%, and female literacy is 47%. In Kud, 14% of the population is under 6 years of age.

Transportation

Air
The nearest airport is Jammu Airport in Jammu located 106 kilometres from Kud.

Rail
Kud is not connected with railways. The nearest railway station is Udhampur railway station located 38 kilometres from Kud.

Road
Kud is well-connected with roads and highways. The NH 44 passes through Kud on the way towards Srinagar.

See also
Jammu and Kashmir
Patnitop
Sanasar
Udhampur railway station
Jammu Airport

References

Cities and towns in Udhampur district
Himalayas